The 1931 Tour de France was the 25th edition of the Tour de France, one of cycling's Grand Tours. The Tour began in Paris with a flat stage on 30 June, and Stage 13 occurred on 13 July with a flat stage from Marseille. The race finished in Paris on 26 July.

Stage 13
14 July 1931 - Marseille to Cannes,

Stage 14
15 July 1931 - Cannes to Nice,

Stage 15
17 July 1931 - Nice to Gap,

Stage 16
18 July 1931 - Gap to Grenoble,

Stage 17
19 July 1931 - Grenoble to Aix-les-Bains,

Stage 18
20 July 1931 - Aix-les-Bains to Evian,

Stage 19
21 July 1931 - Evian to Belfort,

Stage 20
22 July 1931 - Belfort to Colmar,

Stage 21
23 July 1931 - Colmar to Metz,

Stage 22
24 July 1931 - Metz to Charleville,

Stage 23
25 July 1931 - Charleville to Malo-les-Bains,

Stage 24
26 July 1931 - Malo-les-Bains to Paris,

References

1931 Tour de France
Tour de France stages